The 2017–18 season was the 93rd season of competitive football in Poland.

League competitions

Ekstraklasa

Regular season

Championship round

Relegation round

I liga

Regular season

Polish Cup

Polish SuperCup

Polish clubs in Europe

Legia Warsaw

2017–18 UEFA Champions League

Qualifying phase

2017–18 UEFA Europa League

Qualifying phase

Jagiellonia Białystok
2017–18 UEFA Europa League

Qualifying phase

Lech Poznań
2017–18 UEFA Europa League

Qualifying phase

Arka Gdynia
2017–18 UEFA Europa League

Qualifying phase

National teams

Poland national team

2018 FIFA World Cup qualification

2018 FIFA World Cup

Group stage

Friendlies

Notes and references